Calvin Avigak Pedersen is a Canadian politician, who was elected to the Legislative Assembly of Nunavut in July 2020. Representing the electoral district of Kugluktuk, he was directly acclaimed to office as the only candidate to register by the nomination deadline following the resignation of his predecessor Mila Adjukak Kamingoak.

He is the grandson of former MLA and Kugluktuk mayor Red Pedersen. His grandmother, Lena Pedersen was the first woman elected to the Legislative Assembly of the Northwest Territories in the Northwest Territories 1970 election.

References

Living people
Members of the Legislative Assembly of Nunavut
Inuit politicians
People from Kugluktuk
21st-century Canadian politicians
Inuit from Nunavut
Year of birth missing (living people)